Li Jingliang (Chinese: 李景亮; pinyin: Lǐ Jǐngliàng; born March 20, 1988) is a Chinese mixed martial artist who competes as a welterweight for the Ultimate Fighting Championship.

Background
Originally from a small town near Tacheng in the Xinjiang UAR of Northwest China, Li competed in Chinese wrestling and trained in Sanda before moving to Beijing in 2008 in order to pursue a career in professional mixed martial arts. Li began training under the tutelage of former UFC Lightweight Zhang Tiequan.

Mixed martial arts career

Early career
Li made his professional debut in 2007, winning via submission due to punches in the second round. He would go on to compile a record of 8–2, capturing the Legend FC Welterweight Championship in the process, before being granted his release and signed by the UFC.

Ultimate Fighting Championship
Li made his promotional debut on May 24, 2014, at UFC 173 against David Michaud, who had an undefeated record of 7–0. Li defeated Michaud via split decision, giving Michaud the first loss of his career.

Li faced Nordine Taleb on October 4, 2014, at UFC Fight Night: MacDonald vs. Saffiedine. Li was able to take Taleb down multiple times throughout the fight and even successfully land significantly more strikes as Taleb was content to counter strike throughout the bout. In a surprising result, Taleb was given the victory by split decision.

Li was expected to face Roger Zapata on May 16, 2015, at UFC Fight Night 66. However, on April 18, it was announced that Zapata was pulled from the fight due to undisclosed reasons and replaced by Brazilian fighter Dhiego Lima. Li won the fight via knockout in the first round.

Li was expected to face Kiichi Kunimoto on September 27, 2015, at UFC Fight Night 75. However, Kunimoto pulled out of the fight in late August citing injury and was replaced by returning Japanese veteran Keita Nakamura. After dominating the first two rounds, Li lost the fight via technical submission in the third round.

Li faced Anton Zafir on July 8, 2016, at The Ultimate Fighter 23 Finale. Li defeated Zafir via knockout in the first round.

Li was expected to face Chad Laprise on December 10, 2016, at UFC 206. However, Laprise pulled out of the fight on November 16 citing an undisclosed injury. As a result, Li was pulled from the card entirely and rescheduled to a future event.

Li was expected to face Yancy Medeiros on January 28, 2017, at UFC on Fox 23. However, in early January, Medeiros pulled out for undisclosed reasons and was replaced by Bobby Nash. Li defeated Nash via knockout in the second round.

Li faced Frank Camacho on June 17, 2017, at UFC Fight Night: Holm vs. Correia. He won the fight via unanimous decision. This win earned Li his second Fight of the Night bonus award.

Li faced Zak Ottow on November 25, 2017, at UFC Fight Night: Bisping vs. Gastelum. He won the fight via TKO in the first round. The win also earned Li his first Performance of the Night bonus award.

Li faced Jake Matthews on February 11, 2018, at UFC 221. He lost the fight via unanimous decision and received criticism for his eye gouge of Matthews. This fight earned him the Fight of the Night bonus.

Li faced Daichi Abe on June 23, 2018, at UFC Fight Night 132. He won the fight via unanimous decision.

Li was scheduled to face Elizeu Zaleski dos Santos on November 24, 2018, at UFC Fight Night 141. However, on October 27, 2018, it was reported that Zaleski withdrew from the bout due to a partial ligament tear in his right knee, and he is replaced by David Zawada. He won the fight via technical knockout in round three.

Li was expected to face Alex Oliveira on April 27, 2019, at UFC on ESPN 3. However, on March 24, 2019, it was report Li pulled from the bout, citing injury.

Li was expected to be in a pairing with Elizeu Zaleski dos Santos that was rescheduled and took place on August 31, 2019, at UFC Fight Night 157. Li won the fight via technical knockout in round three. The win earned Li his third Performance of the Night bonus award.

Li faced Neil Magny on March 7, 2020, at UFC 248. He lost the fight by unanimous decision.

Li was scheduled to face Dwight Grant on December 12, 2020, at UFC 256. However, on December 8, 2020, Grant tested positive for COVID-19 during fight week and had to pull out. A replacement opponent for Li wasn't able to be found, and therefore Li was removed from the event.

Li faced Santiago Ponzinibbio, replacing Muslim Salikhov, on January 16, 2021, at UFC on ABC 1. He won the fight via first-round knockout. This win earned him the Performance of the Night award.

Li faced Khamzat Chimaev on October 30, 2021, at UFC 267. He lost the bout after getting choked unconscious via rear-naked choke in the first round.

Li faced Muslim Salikhov on July 16, 2022, at UFC on ABC 3. He won the fight via TKO in the second round. This win earned him Performance of the Night bonus award.

Li was scheduled to face Tony Ferguson on September 10, 2022, at UFC 279. However, due to Khamzat Chimaev missing weight, Li faced Daniel Rodriguez who was originally scheduled to face Kevin Holland in a catchweight bout. He lost the back-and-forth fight via split decision. 21 out of 23 media scores gave it to Jingliang.

Li is scheduled to face Michael Chiesa on April 8, 2023 at UFC 287.

Personal life
Li and his wife have a daughter (born 2015) and a son (born 2020).

Championships and accomplishments

Mixed Martial Arts
Legend Fighting Championship
Legend FC Welterweight Championship (One time)
Ultimate Fighting Championship
Fight of the Night (Two times)  vs Frank Camacho and Jake Matthews
Performance of the Night (Five times) 
Tied (Thiago Alves and Vicente Luque) for second most knockouts in UFC Welterweight division history (8)

Brazilian jiu-jitsu
China Open Jiu-jitsu Tournament 
2013 1st place - Absolute (Purple Belt)
2013 1st place - 92 kg (Purple Belt)

Mixed martial arts record

|-
|Loss
|align=center|19–8
|Daniel Rodriguez 
|Decision (split)
|UFC 279
|
|align=center|3
|align=center|5:00
|Las Vegas, Nevada, United States
|
|-
|Win
|align=center|19–7
|Muslim Salikhov
|TKO (punches and elbows)
|UFC on ABC: Ortega vs. Rodríguez
|
|align=center|2
|align=center|4:38
|Elmont, New York, United States
|
|-
|Loss
|align=center|18–7
|Khamzat Chimaev 
|Technical Submission (rear-naked choke)
|UFC 267 
|
|align=center|1
|align=center|3:16
|Abu Dhabi, United Arab Emirates
|  
|-
|Win
|align=center|18–6
|Santiago Ponzinibbio
|KO (punch)
|UFC on ABC: Holloway vs. Kattar
|
|align=center|1
|align=center|4:25
|Abu Dhabi, United Arab Emirates
|
|-
|Loss
|align=center|17–6
|Neil Magny
|Decision (unanimous)
|UFC 248
|
|align=center|3
|align=center|5:00
|Las Vegas, Nevada, United States
|
|-
|Win
|align=center|17–5
|Elizeu Zaleski dos Santos
|TKO (punches)
|UFC Fight Night: Andrade vs. Zhang
|
|align=center|3
|align=center|4:51
|Shenzhen, China
|
|-
|Win
|align=center|16–5
|David Zawada
|TKO (body kick and punches)
|UFC Fight Night: Blaydes vs. Ngannou 2
|
|align=center|3
|align=center|4:07
|Beijing, China
|
|-
|Win
|align=center|15–5
|Daichi Abe
|Decision (unanimous)
|UFC Fight Night: Cowboy vs. Edwards
|
|align=center|3
|align=center|5:00
|Kallang, Singapore
|
|-
|Loss
|align=center|14–5
|Jake Matthews
|Decision (unanimous)
|UFC 221
|
|align=center|3
|align=center|5:00
|Perth, Australia
|
|- 
|Win
|align=center|14–4
|Zak Ottow
|TKO (punches)
|UFC Fight Night: Bisping vs. Gastelum
|
|align=center|1
|align=center|2:57
|Shanghai, China
|
|-
|Win
|align=center|13–4
|Frank Camacho
|Decision (unanimous)
|UFC Fight Night: Holm vs. Correia
|
|align=center|3
|align=center|5:00
|Kallang, Singapore
|
|-
|Win
|align=center|12–4
|Bobby Nash
|KO (punches)
|UFC on Fox: Shevchenko vs. Peña
|
|align=center|2
|align=center|4:45
|Denver, Colorado, United States
|
|-
|Win
|align=center|11–4
|Anton Zafir
|KO (punches)
|The Ultimate Fighter: Team Joanna vs. Team Cláudia Finale
|
|align=center|1
|align=center|2:46
|Las Vegas, Nevada, United States
|
|-
|Loss
|align=center|10–4
|Keita Nakamura
|Technical Submission (standing rear-naked choke)
|UFC Fight Night: Barnett vs. Nelson
|
|align=center|3
|align=center|2:17
|Saitama, Japan
|
|-
|Win
|align=center|10–3
|Dhiego Lima
| KO (punches)
|UFC Fight Night: Edgar vs. Faber
|
|align=center|1
|align=center|1:25
|Pasay, Philippines
|
|-
| Loss
|align=center| 9–3
| Nordine Taleb
| Decision (split)
| UFC Fight Night: MacDonald vs. Saffiedine
| 
|align=center| 3
|align=center| 5:00
|Halifax, Nova Scotia, Canada
|
|-
| Win
|align=center| 9–2
| David Michaud
| Decision (split)
| UFC 173
| 
|align=center| 3
|align=center| 5:00
|Las Vegas, Nevada, United States
| 
|-
| Win
|align=center| 8–2
| Luke Jumeau
| Submission (guillotine choke)
| Legend FC 11
| 
|align=center| 3
|align=center| 3:38
|Kuala Lumpur, Malaysia
|
|-
| Win
|align=center| 7–2
| Dan Pauling
| Decision (unanimous)
| Legend FC 9
| 
|align=center| 3
|align=center| 5:00
|Macau, SAR, China
|
|-
| Loss
|align=center| 6–2
| Myung Ho Bae
| Decision (unanimous)
| Legend FC 7
| 
|align=center| 3
|align=center| 5:00
|Macau, SAR, China
|
|-
| Win
|align=center| 6–1
| Alex Niu
| Decision (unanimous)
| Legend FC 5
| 
|align=center| 3
|align=center| 5:00
|Hong Kong, SAR, China
| 
|-
| Win
|align=center| 5–1
| Tony Rossini
| Technical Submission (guillotine choke)
| Legend FC 4
| 
|align=center| 2
|align=center| 1:11
|Hong Kong, SAR, China
| 
|-
| Win
|align=center| 4–1
| Andrei Liu
| TKO (punches)
| Legend FC 3
| 
|align=center| 1
|align=center| 3:43
|Hong Kong, SAR, China
| 
|-
| Loss
|align=center| 3–1
| Pat Crawley
| Decision (unanimous)
| Legend FC 2
| 
|align=center| 3
|align=center| 5:00
|Hong Kong, SAR, China
| 
|-
| Win
|align=center| 3–0
| Yun Tao Gong
| Submission (guillotine choke)
| AOW 15: Ueyama vs. Aohailin
| 
|align=center| 1
|align=center| 5:29
|Beijing, China
| 
|-
| Win
|align=center| 2–0
| Liu Jin Wen
| Submission (guillotine choke)
| Ultimate Martial Arts Combat
| 
|align=center| 1
|align=center| 3:05
|Beijing, China
| 
|-
| Win
|align=center| 1–0
| Makhach Gadzhiev
| TKO (submission to punches)
| AOW 8: Worlds Collide
| 
|align=center| 2
|align=center| 1:02
|Beijing, China
|

See also
List of current UFC fighters
List of male mixed martial artists
List of UFC bonus award recipients

References

External links

1988 births
Living people
People from Tacheng
Sportspeople from Xinjiang
Welterweight mixed martial artists
Chinese male mixed martial artists
Chinese practitioners of Brazilian jiu-jitsu
People awarded a black belt in Brazilian jiu-jitsu
Chinese male sport wrestlers
Chinese sanshou practitioners
Ultimate Fighting Championship male fighters
Mixed martial artists utilizing sanshou
Mixed martial artists utilizing Shuai Jiao
Mixed martial artists utilizing Brazilian jiu-jitsu